The 2012 BRD Timișoara Challenger was a professional tennis tournament played on clay courts. It was the sixth edition of the tournament which was part of the 2012 ATP Challenger Tour. It took place in Timișoara, Romania between 9 and 15 July 2012.

Singles main draw entrants

Seeds

 1 Rankings are as of June 25, 2012.

Other entrants
The following players received wildcards into the singles main draw:
  Andrei Dăescu
  Dragoș Cristian Mîrtea
  Florin Mergea

The following players received entry as an alternate into the singles main draw:
  Denis Zivkovic

The following players received entry from the qualifying draw:
  Alexandros Jakupovic
  James Marsalek
  Răzvan Sabău
  Goran Tošić

Champions

Singles

 Victor Hănescu def.  Guillaume Rufin, 6–0, 6–3

Doubles

 Goran Tošić /  Denis Zivkovic def.  Andrei Dăescu /  Florin Mergea, 6–2, 7–5

External links
Official Website

BRD Timisoara Challenger
BRD Timișoara Challenger
2012 in Romanian tennis
July 2012 sports events in Romania